The Swain Islands are a group of small islands and rocks about  in extent, lying  north of Clark Peninsula at the northeast end of the Windmill Islands. Delineated from aerial photographs taken by U.S. Navy Operation Highjump in February 1947. Named by the Advisory Committee on Antarctic Names (US-ACAN) for K. C. Swain who served as air crewman with the central task group of U.S. Navy Operation Highjump, 1946–47, and also with USN. Operation Windmill which obtained aerial and ground photographic coverage of the Windmill Islands in January 1948.

Islands
 Berkley Island
 Bradford Rock
 Burnett Island
 Cameron Island
 Daniel Island
 Hailstorm Island
 Honkala Island
 Wonsey Rock
 Wyche Island

See also 
 Composite Antarctic Gazetteer
 List of Antarctic and sub-Antarctic islands
 List of Antarctic islands south of 60° S
 SCAR
 Territorial claims in Antarctica
 Swains Island

References

External links 

Windmill Islands